This is a list of notable Costa Rican politicians.

A
Vicente Aguilar Cubero
Florentino Alfaro Zamora
Alejandro Alvarado García
Carlos Alvarado Quesada
Antonio Álvarez Desanti
Apolinar de Jesús Soto Quesada
Johnny Araya Monge
Rolando Araya Monge
Óscar Arias Sánchez
Isaac Felipe Azofeifa
Bernardo Rodríguez y Alfaro

B
Manuel Antonio Bonilla Nava
Miguel de Bonilla y Laya-Bolívar
Roberto Brenes Mesén

C
Francisco Calderón Guardia
Rafael Calderón Muñoz
Joaquín Bernardo Calvo Rosales
Rodrigo Alberto Carazo Zeledón
Kevin Casas Zamora
Florencio del Castillo
Ricardo Castro Beeche
Ramón Castro y Ramírez
Alberto Cañas Escalante
José Joaquín Chaverri Sievert
Laura Chinchilla Miranda
Cipriano Pérez y Arias
José Andrés Coronado Alvarado
Fernando Coto Albán

D
Domingo González Pérez
Carlos Durán Cartín

E
Aquileo J. Echeverría
Alberto Salom Echeverría
Epsy Campbell Barr
Narciso Esquivel y Salazar

F
Máximo Fernández Alvarado
Mauro Fernández Acuña
José María Figueres
Eusebio Figueroa Oreamuno

G
Germán Serrano Pinto
Gerardo Gómez Ramírez
Victoria Guardia Alvarado
Ezequiel Gutiérrez Iglesias
Gerardo Guzmán Quirós

I
Francisco María Iglesias Llorente
Joaquín de Iglesias Vidamartel

J
Ramón Jiménez y Robredo
Agapito Jiménez Zamora
Joaquín García Monge
Jorge Hine Saborío
José Francisco de Peralta y López del Corral
José Miguel Corrales Bolaños
Juan Fernando Echeverría
Juan José de Bonilla y Herdocia
Juan de Obregón y Espinosa

L
Pedro María León-Páez y Brown
Lorena Clare Facio
Luis Diego Sáenz Carazo

M
Rodrigo Madrigal Nieto
Juan de los Santos Madriz y Cervantes
Manuel José Carazo Bonilla
Manuel María de Peralta y López del Corral
Manuel de Jesús Jiménez Oreamuno
Marco Vinicio Vargas Pereira
María Elena Carballo
Juan Rafael Mata Lafuente
Carlos Meléndez Chaverri
José Merino del Río
Miguel Carranza Fernández
Felipe Francisco Molina y Bedoya
Francisco Montealegre Fernández
Félix Arcadio Montero Monge
Lorenzo Montúfar y Rivera
José Joaquín Mora Porras
Manuel Mora Valverde
Ricardo Moreno Cañas
Rafael Moya Murillo
Pedro Muñoz Fonseca

N
Bernd H. Niehaus Quesada

O
Karen Olsen Beck
Otto Guevara Guth

P
Abel Pacheco
Margarita Penón Góngora
Manuel María de Peralta y Alfaro
René Picado Michalski
José Concepción Pinto y Castro
Eusebio Prieto y Ruiz

Q
José Pablo Quirós Quirós

R
Rafael Ramírez Hidalgo
Percy Rodríguez
Miguel Ángel Rodríguez
Jorge Rossi Chavarría

S
José Carlos Sáenz Esquivel
Fernando Sánchez Campos
Benito Serrano Jiménez
Ottón Solís Fallas
Luis Guillermo Solís
Bruno Stagno Ugarte

T
Tobías Zúñiga Castro
Ricardo Toledo Carranza
Nazario Toledo
Tomás Enrique Soley Soler
Roberto Tovar Faja
Tranquilino de Bonilla y Herdocia
Gerardo Trejos Salas

U
Juan José Ulloa Solares

V
Marco Vargas Diaz
Santos Velázquez y Tinoco
Andrés Venegas
José María Villalta Florez-Estrada
Fernando Volio Jiménez
Jorge Volio Jiménez
Julián Volio Llorente
Víctor Morales Mora

Z
José María Zeledón Brenes

 
Costa Rican
Politicians